Kiss is a British digital radio station owned and operated by Bauer as part of the Kiss Network. 

It is primarily aimed at the 15-34 age group and broadcasts nationally to the UK on DAB Digital Radio, as well as on FM in London, Bristol and the Severn Estuary, and East Anglia. The station started in 1985 as a pirate radio station, Kiss FM, before beginning legal broadcasting in 1990 as Kiss 100, specialising in black and dance music.

As of June 2022, the station has a weekly audience of 2.5 million listeners according to RAJAR.

History

Pirate roots
Kiss FM first broadcast 7 October 1985 as a pirate radio station, initially to South London then across the whole city, on 94FM. Kiss FM was founded by Gordon "Mac" McNamee, George Power (of London Greek Radio), and Tosca Jackson, with its engineer Pyers Easton. Transmitting seven-days from the start, it would be regularly taken off-air by the authorities and so became a weekend operation shortly afterwards.

The station developed a cult and committed following across Greater London, with figures in the press at the time stating that the station commanded some 500,000 listeners while operating as an unlicensed pirate station, and an Evening Standard readers' poll in 1987 put Kiss second, behind Capital Radio. Gordon Mac approached a successful London club promoter, Guy Wingate, to discuss ways of improving the Kiss FM profile. As a result, Wingate launched the very successful Kiss nights at the Wag Club (which included the first ever UK acid house party – an idea put forward by Colin Faver and Danny Rampling), both DJs on the station. These nights increased the station's credibility with its target audience and Wingate joined the Kiss team, followed shortly thereafter by Lindsay Wesker. Kiss would also run its own night at Dingwalls and adopted the slogan Radical Radio.

Mac and ten of the DJs on the station including Norman Jay, Jonathan More, Colin Faver, Trevor Nelson, and Tim Westwood would become "shareholders" in a company called Goodfoot Promotions, with Mac heading up the station as its majority holder. By 1988, Kiss was at its strongest with a DJ line-up which had become the cream of London's clubland, and in that December, Mac and the other shareholders would announce that they would decide to close down in order to apply for a legal licence. This was in response to the UK Government and Independent Broadcasting Authority (IBA) announcement that twenty new "incremental radio" licences would be advertised, including one for London. Stations were told that they would have to voluntarily closedown when applying, and so on New Year's Eve 1988, the final broadcast went out with an outside broadcast at Dingwalls.

Kiss would submit a strong application with widespread support from listeners, clubs, record labels and music magazines, however on 12 July 1989, the IBA instead awarded the licence to Jazz FM.

Legal licence
Despite the temptation to return to the air again illegally, Kiss held off as the IBA floated that further licences would be made available, which they did in September 1989. Kiss re-prepared their application, but this time would gain the backing and majority investment of media group EMAP. On 17 December 1989, the IBA announced that Kiss had been awarded a licence on their second attempt.

Kiss would establish its new studios and office on Holloway Road, and on 1 September 1990, Kiss commenced its legal broadcasting as Kiss 100. Gordon Mac led a countdown in the studio to the official launch; the first tune played being "Pirates Anthem" by Cocoa Tea and Shabba Ranks, followed by Norman Jay hosting the very first full show.

The Channel 4 documentary Radical Radio followed Kiss as it came off air as a pirate station, gained its licence, built its new studios, and commenced legal broadcasting.

Kiss 101 (Bristol)

Starting out as a Bristol pirate radio station, it became part of the Galaxy Radio network broadcasting to South Wales and the West of England, playing pop, dance, hip hop, urban, R&B and electronic music as Galaxy 101. It was eventually bought by EMAP and became Kiss 101 in September 2006 and part of the Kiss network.

Kiss 102 (Manchester) and Kiss 105 (Yorkshire)

The Faze FM group licensed the name and logo from Kiss 100 to launch Kiss 102 in Manchester in October 1994. In February 1997, it expanded into Yorkshire launching Kiss 105. The group was later sold to Chrysalis Radio, and by September 1997 both stations became part of the Galaxy Radio network.

Kiss 105-108 (East Anglia)

The East Anglian and Severn Estuary versions of Kiss were previously known as Vibe FM. EMAP bought the stations from Scottish Radio Holdings in August 2005, and rebranded them in September 2006.

EMAP rebranding and criticism

EMAP took full control of Kiss 100 as early as 1992, but with Mac having left the station in March 1998, EMAP would embark on a rebranding of the station and to align it with the rest of its radio operations.

In December 1998, one of stations most popular DJs, Steve Jackson, was dismissed resulting in a high-profile court case, whilst the changes led to criticism from both former presenters and listeners alike, concerned that Kiss 100 was losing its musical direction. DJs Coldcut, Bob Jones, and Manasseh quit the station in January 1999 in protest at the changes being implemented. Other DJs at this time were being lured away by the increasingly dance-oriented BBC Radio 1.

Mark Story (previously of Magic 105.4) was appointed as the new Director of Music Programming, along with moving the Kiss studios and office to EMAPs main premises at Mappin House, Central London, and creating a new logo. Andy Roberts became Kiss Programme Director.

In July 1999, The Independent reported: "In preparation for the new ad campaign, the biggest in the station's history, EMAP has spent twelve months changing the output of the station. Over ten DJs have parted company with the station, including Steve Jackson, who won the Sony breakfast show award this year. In the words of Mr Cox [EMAP marketing director], the music on the station has been "smoothed out"."

Ofcom record fine

In June 2006, Kiss 100 was fined £175,000 by media regulator Ofcom, a record fee for any UK commercial radio station. Ofcom punished Kiss 100 for "numerous and serious breaches" of broadcasting codes after receiving ten complaints from April to November 2005. They involved prank calls on the Bam Bam breakfast show where consent was not sought from the "victims" and controversial material aired when children were likely to be listening. Kiss 100 said it accepted the findings and apologised for any offence

Second rebranding and Kiss network

EMAP introduced a second major revamp of the Kiss brand on 6 September 2006. This included a new logo designed by oddlondon, a renewed focus on dance music, more specialist shows and a new website for all three Kiss stations, replacing the previous website.

The relaunch was implemented simultaneously with the rebranding of Kiss 100's sister dance stations, Vibe 101 and Vibe 105–108 as Kiss 101 and Kiss 105-108 respectively. Changes at Kiss 100 were introduced to address falling listener figures and to keep the station competitive in the highly contested London market. Roberts became its Group Programme Director.

A year later, EMAP sold its radio division to Bauer Radio.

DAB changes and Rodigan departure

In December 2010, Ofcom approved the request from Bauer to drop local programming content from the three Kiss stations, creating a national service on the condition that Kiss would be available on 35 DAB multiplexes around the UK on the day local information is dropped, rising to 38 within three months of the changes.

On 27 December 2012, Kiss 100 appeared nationally on Digital One's national DAB multiplex.

David Rodigan, who had been with Kiss since its legal launch in 1990, resigned in November 2012, citing the "continued marginalisation of reggae music" on the station.

Under Roberts, Kiss extended its stations, launching Kisstory in May 2013.

Norway and Finland
On 26 February 2016, Kiss was launched in Norway rebranded from The Voice Hiphop & RnB Norway and Finland.

Logo history

DJs/ presenters

Pirate and early legal era
From 1985, DJs and presenters have included: Norman Jay, Coldcut (Matt Black & Jonathan More), Paul Trouble Anderson, Colin Dale, Colin Faver, Judge Jules, Tim Westwood, Lindsay Wesker, Max LX & Dave VJ, Jazzie B, Steve Jackson, Trevor Nelson, Lisa I'Anson, Danny Rampling and Richie Rich. At its legal launch and early 1990s, this would also include Graham Gold, Dave Pearce, David Rodigan, Pete Wardman, Patrick Forge, Somethin' Else (Chris Phillips & Jez Nelson), and Gilles Peterson.

Mid to late 1990s
In the mid-late 1990s, DJs and presenters have included: Tall Pall, Matt Jam Lamont, Dreem Teem, Fabio & Grooverider, Brandon Block, Jumpin Jack Frost, Kenny Ken, DJ Hype, Ray Keith, R-Solution (4hero & Kirk Degiorgio), Tony De Vit, and Slipmatt.

2000s
Since 2000, DJs and presenters have included: Bam Bam, Andy C, John Digweed, Ali B, Robin Banks, Adam F, DJ EZ, Steve Smart, Carl Cox, Logan Sama, DJ Hatcha, Paul Oakenfold, Armin van Buuren, Rickie Haywood Williams, Melvin Odoom, Charlie Hedges, Hed Kandi, Philip George,  DJ S.K.T , Jordan Banjo and Perri Kiely, and Tyler West.

See also
Kiss Does... Rave
Kiss Network

References

Further reading
Grant Goddard, KISS FM: From Radical Radio to Big Business, 2011 Radio Books.

External links

Bauer Radio
Rhythmic contemporary radio stations
Dance radio stations
Radio stations in London
Radio stations established in 1985
1985 establishments in England
Former pirate radio stations
Kiss Network
Pirate radio stations in the United Kingdom
Electronic dance music radio stations in the United Kingdom